Gruzino is the name of several rural localities in Russia:
Gruzino, Leningrad Oblast, a village in Kuyvozovskoye Settlement Municipal Formation of Vsevolozhsky District of Leningrad Oblast
Gruzino, Novgorod Oblast, a selo in Gruzinskoye Settlement of Chudovsky District of Novgorod Oblast